Hamza akl Hamieh (known simply as 'Hamza') was born in Baalbek, Lebanon, in 1954. And died on 1 February 2018  In his twenties, he became a follower of Shi'ite religious leader, Imam Musa al-Sadr. He gained notoriety as a prolific aircraft hijacker. He completed at least six hijackings between 1979 and 1982, his most notable being the hijacking of Kuwait Airways 561 in Beirut on February 24, 1982. Just 79 days earlier, he had completed the second longest hijacking in history, after commandeering Libyan Arab Airlines 727 in midair between Zurich and Tripoli, flying 6,000 miles with multiple stops throughout Europe and the Middle East before landing in Lebanon three days later.

In 1984, Hamza was appointed military commander of the Lebanese Shi'ite political movement Afwaj al Muqawimal al Lubnaniya (Lebanese Resistance Regiments). until his death, he resided in Lebanon, and was interviewed in Beirut in November 2014.

Militant career 
According to Hamza Akl Hamieh, he early volunteered for the Amal youth movement which "helped him to reach the state of mind in which he eventually joined the Hezbollah." At the age of approximately twenty, he joined the leftist Muslim side of the Lebanese Civil War in Beirut. And in 1978 he fought the Israeli invasion.

He became popular among young Shi'ites while he hijacked 6 planes in response to the disappearance of Musa al Sadr. Starting in 1979 with his "Sons of Musa al Sadr brigade" and ending on February 24, 1982, with the hijacking of the Kuwait Airways 561 flight. Just 79 days earlier, he had completed the second longest hijacking in history, after commandeering Libyan Arab Airlines 727 in midair between Zurich and Tripoli, flying 6,000 miles with multiple stops throughout Europe and the Middle East before landing in Lebanon three days later.

As an Amal commander in the early 1980's Hamieh led many operations against the Multinational Force in Lebanon. Including the 1983 barracks bombings that killed 241 US military personnel and an attack in January 1984 on airport positions.

The US intelligence mentions Hamza as a possible organizer of the TWA flight hijacking

Hamza Akl Hamieh served as military commander of Amal between 1984 and 1987 and completely left Amal in 1992

Having ties with Hezbollah he formed the Castle Brigade so that Sunnis in Baalbek could fight in the Syrian Civil War.

Internationally 
He fought in 1979 in Afghanistan against the Soviets and in the Iran–Iraq War on the Iranian side. In the 2010's he was advising the Kurds how to fight ISIS

References 

 Wright, R. (1985) Sacred Rage: The Wrath of Militant Islam. Andre Deutsch Ltd. London.
 Gerringer, A. (2002) Terrorism: From One Millennium to the Next. Writers Club Press. Lincoln NE.
 'Fractured Lebanon Faces Growing Islamist Threat from Syria.' The Interpreter. 23 Dec. 2014 

Year of birth missing (living people)
Living people
People from Baalbek
Hijackers